The 2018 Towson Tigers football team represented Towson University in the 2018 NCAA Division I FCS football season. They were led by tenth-year head coach Rob Ambrose and played their home games at Johnny Unitas Stadium. They are a member of the Colonial Athletic Association. They finished the season 7–5, 5–3 in CAA play to finish in a three-way tie for third place. They received an at-large bid to the FCS Playoffs where they lost in the first round to Duquesne.

Previous season
The Tigers finished the 2017 season 5–6, 3–5 in CAA play to finish in a three-way tie for seventh place.

Preseason

CAA Poll
In the CAA preseason poll released on July 24, 2018, the Tigers were predicted to finish in tenth place. They did not have any players selected to the preseason all-CAA team.

Schedule

Game summaries

at Morgan State

at Wake Forest

at Villanova

The Citadel

Stony Brook

William & Mary

at Albany

at Delaware

Maine

at Elon

James Madison

FCS Playoffs

Duquesne–First Round

Ranking movements

References

Towson
Towson Tigers football seasons
Towson
Towson Tigers football